The Yaloupi or Yaroupi is a river in French Guiana. It rises in the south of the country, flowing northeast until it reaches the river Oyapock near the temporary village of Oscar.

References

Rivers of French Guiana
Rivers of France